Little Shasta Church is a church located in Little Shasta, California.

History
In 1875, after a series of meetings, Reverend Roswell Graves organized the church, then known as Little Shasta Congregational Church, which was built in 1878.

References

Churches in California
Buildings and structures in Siskiyou County, California
1875 establishments in California
Wooden churches in California